Mark Cairns (born 25 September 1969) is a Scottish football goalkeeper, who played for Heart of Midlothian, Berwick Rangers, East Stirlingshire, Gala Fairydean, Partick Thistle, Alloa Athletic, Brechin City, Queen's Park, Stirling Albion and Arbroath.

While at Alloa Cairns played in the 1999 Scottish Challenge Cup Final. The match went to penalties; Cairns saved two and also scored one himself as they defeated Inverness Caledonian Thistle.

Honours

Player
Alloa Athletic
Scottish Challenge Cup 1999–2000

References

External links

1969 births
Living people
Association football goalkeepers
Scottish footballers
Heart of Midlothian F.C. players
Berwick Rangers F.C. players
East Stirlingshire F.C. players
Gala Fairydean Rovers F.C. players
Partick Thistle F.C. players
Alloa Athletic F.C. players
Brechin City F.C. players
Queen's Park F.C. players
Stirling Albion F.C. players
Arbroath F.C. players
Scottish Football League players
Bo'ness United F.C. players
Footballers from Edinburgh